is a Japanese adult visual novel developed and published by Terios. It was later adapted into a hentai OVA series; four episodes were released from August 25, 2000, to November 25, 2001, and two additional episodes, titled , were released from August 25, 2002 to February 25, 2003. A 13-episode anime television series adaptation titled , which excluded the pornographic content, was broadcast from January 1 to March 26, 2005.

The OVA series was previously licensed for distribution in North America by NuTech Digital in 2004. Since 2006, the OVA is licensed by Adult Source Media. The anime television series was licensed by Discotek Media in 2017 under the title Magical Canan.

Plot
Five dangerous "seeds" have been stolen from their vault in the world of Evergreen and sent to Earth. The magical seeds can bind themselves to humans and prey off their desires, turning them into monsters. Natsuki, an agent of Queen Tsuyuha, is sent to Earth to seek out a Magical Warrior. He and Hiiragi Chihaya, a high school girl, meet, and she transforms into Magical Senshi Carmein. Complications arise with the arrival of the obnoxious Magical Warrior Cerulean Blue, and the mysterious transfer student, Emi Kojima.

Characters
Note that the following descriptions are specific to the anime television series.

A high school student who works at Angel Kiss, the restaurant managed by her mother. With the help of Natsuki, she can transform into Magical Warrior Carmein (カーマイン). Carmein is Chihaya's idealized self (a more adult appearance) and she also receives magical powers while in that form.

An animal that appeared at Chihaya's school. He appears to be similar to a rabbit but is an unknown animal and the school nurse wished to dissect him when he was captured. Chihaya rescued him and took him to her house, though problems arose with her parents as animals are not permitted in the restaurant. Natsuki revealed himself to be a person from Evergreen, a magical land. He appears as an animal due to lack of magical energy. Despite his intimacy with Chihaya, she is chalk and cheese with him in the OVA, but this has been dulled down quite a lot in the anime.

A very rich girl who is Chihaya's close friend. She can transform into Magical Warrior Cerulean Blue (with the help of her partner Hazuna) and takes the form of her idealized self (being more outspoken). She has a strong bond with Hazuna, so she is very powerful as a Magical Warrior, however, this consumes much of her physical strength, so she is weak in her civilian form.

Sayaka's partner and an agent of Queen Tsuyuha. Like Natsuki, he has the ability to transform Sayaka into a Magical Warrior. His animal form is similar to a purple ferret (a yellow one in the OVA). He poses as Sayaka's private tutor. He is also Natsuki's brother.

A girl from Evergreen who transfers to Chihaya's school under the name Emi Kojima. Her real name is Septem. She is in love with Bergamot, but he is only attracted to her because of her resemblance to his wife, Emi Hiiragi. She works with Bergamot to help protect Chihaya from Fennel and Calendula. Though depicted as a heroine in the anime, in the OVA she was depicted as a villainess.

Chihaya's father. Fennel talked him into stealing the seeds from their vault. Even before that, however, he became a fugitive for eloping with the human Emi Hiiragi, who became Chihaya's mother. Eventually he comes to Earth with Septem with the intent of protecting Chihaya from Fennel. While on Earth, he poses as a teacher at Chihaya's school under the name Jounouchi.

The main antagonist of the series. He is the one behind the seeds coming to Earth. He aims to harness Chihaya/Carmein's power at its peak, infecting her and using it to destroy the world and "purify" it. On Earth he poses as the chairman of Chihaya's school.

Fennel's underling. She is responsible for infecting the individual humans with seeds. Near the end of the series, she is infected with first one, then two seeds so as to make her stronger, which ends up destroying her.

Music
Opening theme: "Magical Chodai" by Ui Miyazaki
Ending theme: "Koi Gokoro" by Ai Tokunaga

Reception
The OVA series released on DVD by NuTech Digital, Inc. was reviewed by Chris Beveridge for the media blog Mania.com. He gave a positive review for Magical Kanan Box Set and gave it an overall grade of "B." He gave a less positive review for the two-episode Magical Kanan Special Box Set and gave it an overall grade of "C."

See also
 Papillon Rose
 UFO Ultramaiden Valkyrie

Notes

References

External links
 Canan official website 
 Kanan MxTV website—requires Flash 
 
 

2000 anime OVAs
2005 anime television series debuts
Anime International Company
Discotek Media
Eroge
Hentai anime and manga
Magical girl anime and manga
Magical girl parodies
Tokyo MX original programming